Sameer Magan Bhujbal (born 9 October 1973) is an Indian politician and a leader of the Nationalist Congress Party. He was member of the 15th Lok Sabha representing Nashik in Maharashtra state in India from 2009 to 2014.

He is nephew of senior Nationalist Congress Party leader Chhagan Bhujbal.

References

India MPs 2009–2014
Marathi politicians
Living people
1973 births
Nationalist Congress Party politicians from Maharashtra
People from Nashik
Lok Sabha members from Maharashtra
Corruption in Maharashtra
Indian prisoners and detainees